Zekeriya Sertel, also known as Mehmet Zekeriya Sertel, (1890–1980) was a Turkish journalist. He is the first director of state press department and founder and editor of various periodicals. From 1950 to 1980 Sertel lived in exile.

Early life and education
Zekeriya Sertel was born in Ustrumca, Macedonia, Ottoman Empire, in 1890. He graduated from law faculty of Istanbul University. Then he studied sociology at Sorbonne University and journalism at Columbia University.

Career
One of his earliest journalist activities was the establishment of a satirical magazine, Diken, together with Sedat Simavi in 1918. Next year Zekeriya Sertel and his colleagues founded a weekly magazine entitled Büyük Mecmua (meaning the Big Review in English). He and his wife, Sabiha, lived in New York City until 1923 where Zekeriya studied journalism at Columbia University and Sabiha attended the New York School of Social Work. They were granted the Charles Crane scholarship with the help of fellow journalist and writer Halide Edib Adıvar.

Following their return to Turkey Zekeriya was appointed by Mustafa Kemal Atatürk as director of press department of the newly founded Republic of Turkey in Ankara which he held until 1924 after which his wife and he restarted their journalistic career in Istanbul. He was the cofounder and first editor-in-chief of Cumhuriyet newspaper. With his wife he founded and edited several magazines including Resimli Ay, Resimli Perşembe, Resimli Hafta and Sevimli Ay. He also cofounded with other three journalists a newspaper named Son Posta in 1930. Sabiha and Zekeriya Sertel were among the owners of another newspaper, Tan.

Arrests and exile
In 1919 Zekeriya Sertel was first arrested and detained by the Ottoman authorities due to his articles in Büyük Mecmua which criticised the occupation of Istanbul by the British and other western forces. He was also tried in the Independence Courts which resulted in his three-year imprisonment immediately after the start of weekly magazine Resimli Perşembe in 1925. Then he was arrested several times due to his writings published in Resimli Ay and Tan. His trial was in March 1946 due to his writings in Tan. Not only Zekeriya but also his wife and Halil Lütfü Dördüncü were convicted of libeling the Republic of Turkey and members of the Grand National Assembly. However, in Fall 1946 they all won an appeal. He and his wife left Turkey in 1950 because of political pressures and lived in different countries, namely  the Soviet Union, Hungary and France.

Personal life and death
Sertel married Sabiha Sertel in 1915. Zekeriya's family initially opposed the marriage due to the fact that Sabiha was from a dönme family. Following their exile they lived in Baku until 1968 when Sabiha Sertel died. Sertel had a daughter with who he left Baku for France following the death of his wife. He died in Salpetriere Hospital, Paris, on 12 March 1980.

Books
Sertel was the author of several books, including Mavi Gözlü Dev which is a biography of his friend and poet Nazım Hikmet Ran. Another one is his mémoire entitled Hatırladıklarım (Turkish: Those that I remember) published in 1968.

References

External links

20th-century newspaper founders
20th-century newspaper publishers (people)
20th-century Turkish writers
1890 births
1980 deaths
Cumhuriyet people
Istanbul University alumni
Turkish expatriates in Azerbaijan
Turkish expatriates in France
Turkish magazine founders
Turkish people of Macedonian descent
Turkish prisoners and detainees